Caribbean Roots is the sixth album overall, and second solo album by Trinidadian poet Anthony Joseph.

Track listing 

 "The Kora" 
 "Jimmy, upon that bridge" 
 "Neckbone" 
 "Mano a Mano"
 "Brother Davis (Yanvalou)"
 "Drum Song" 
 "Our History" 
 "Slinger"
 "Powerful Peace"
 "Caribbean Roots"

Personnel 
 Anthony Joseph - Vocals, Poetry, 
 Andrew John - Bass
 Roger Raspail - Percussion
 Jason Yarde - Alto, Soprano and Baritone Saxophones
 Shabaka Hutchings - Saxophones, Clarinet
 Andy Narrell - Steelpans
 Courtney Jones - Steelpans
 Eddie Hick - Drums
 Patrick Marie Magdalene - Guitar
 Pierre Chabrele - Trombone
 Yvon Gulliard - Trumpet
 Florian Pellisier - Keyboards
 Sly Johnson - Vocals*
 David Rudder - Vocals**
 Earl Lovelace - Vocals***
 Mike Clinton - Bass****

References

External links 
 Official Website
 http://www.strut-records.com/anthony-josephs-caribbean-roots/

2016 albums
2010s spoken word albums